Joanne Love (born 6 December 1985) is a Scottish international footballer who plays as a midfielder. Since 2011 she has played for Glasgow City, having previously played in Scotland for Kilmarnock and Celtic, in the English FA Women's Premier League for Doncaster Rovers Belles and in the United States for Cocoa Expos.

Making her international debut aged 16, by 2009 Love had amassed over 75 caps for Scotland. Two years later she became the fourth player to make a century of appearances, behind Pauline Hamill, Julie Fleeting and Gemma Fay. She last appeared for her country in 2019, claiming her 191st cap at the age of 33.

Club career
Born in Paisley and raised in Kilbirnie, Love began her career with Kilmarnock. In 2006 she played in the American W-League for Cocoa Expos.

After three years at Celtic, Love signed for rivals Glasgow City in February 2011; she remained with the club for over a decade, winning multiple Scottish Women's Premier League championships and cups and featuring in the UEFA Women's Champions League.

Outside football Love is a scientist who works as a chemical analyst for Glasgow City Council.

International career
In March 2000, Love was called up to the Scotland under-18 team at the age of 14. She made her senior debut for Scotland in the 2002 Algarve Cup during a 3–0 defeat to Canada and scored her first international goal against France in a February 2004 friendly match.

Love reached 100 caps in March 2011 in a 1–0 loss to Canada during the 2011 Cyprus Cup. She was awarded her 150th cap in a friendly match against Wales in August 2014. By the time of her 191st and last cap in a friendly victory against Brazil in April 2019, she was the national record holder for appearances by an outfield player (she was named in the squad for the 2019 FIFA Women's World Cup two months after that, but did not feature in Scotland's three matches – unlike at the UEFA Women's Euro 2017 tournament where she was introduced as a substitute in the first two matches and started in the third, a win over Spain).

A football training programme for young girls operated by Ayrshire College is named in her honour.

International goals
Scores and results list Scotland's goal tally first. Goal against France in Feb 2004 not included in SFA profile.

See also
 List of women's footballers with 100 or more international caps
 Scottish FA Women's International Roll of Honour

References

External links
 
 
 Glasgow City LFC player profile
Jo Love  at Killiefc.com

1985 births
Living people
Scottish women's footballers
Scotland women's international footballers
Doncaster Rovers Belles L.F.C. players
Celtic F.C. Women players
FA Women's National League players
FIFA Century Club
Glasgow City F.C. players
F.C. Kilmarnock Ladies players
Scottish Women's Premier League players
People from Kilbirnie
Footballers from North Ayrshire
Footballers from Paisley, Renfrewshire
Women's association football midfielders
2019 FIFA Women's World Cup players
Scottish expatriate sportspeople in the United States
Scottish expatriate women's footballers
Expatriate women's soccer players in the United States
USL W-League (1995–2015) players
Scottish women scientists
UEFA Women's Euro 2017 players